Aşağı Ağasıbəyli (also, Agasy-Begly, Ashagy Agasibeyli, and Ashagy-Begly) is a village and municipality in the Samukh Rayon of Azerbaijan.  It has a population of 442.

References 

Populated places in Samukh District